Jaynagar Majilpur Municipality (abbreviated as JMM) is an urban local body of the South 24 Parganas district in the Indian state of West Bengal. It is responsible for the civic infrastructure and administration of the city of Jaynagar Majilpur. It is divided into 14 administrative wards.

Geography
Jaynagar Majilpur Municipality is on the State Highway 1.

History
As per the Town Development Act 1850, Jaynagar Town Committee was established. It was responsible for the statutory planning and development of greater Jaynagar. According to the Bengal Municipal Improvement Act 1864, the town committee was awarded to municipality status and the name was finally set to Jaynagar Majilpur Municipality on 1 April 1869. It is one of the oldest municipalities in India. Harananda Vidyasagar, the father of the famous philosopher Sivanath Sastri, was the first chairman of this municipality.

Structure
The municipality refers to the Board of Councillors, with one Councillor being elected from each of the 14 administrative wards of Jaynagar Majilpur city. The Board of Councillors elects a chairman from among its elected members.

According to the West Bengal Municipal Act 1993, Jaynagar Majilpur Municipality is run by the Chairman-in-Council system of governance and consists of the chairman, Vice Chairman and chief executive officer. The Chairman is the executive head of the municipality and the municipal administration is under his control. The Chairman nominates the Chairman-in-Council and distributes the various functions of the municipality. The Chairman presides over the meetings of the Chairman-in-Council as well as the Board of Councillors and in his absence the Vice Chairman chairs the meetings. The administrative functions of the municipalities are dealt through the committees and are headed by the Chairman-in-Council.

Election
According to the 2022 municipal election, Jaynagar Majilpur Municipality is currently under the control of the All India Trinamool Congress. In that municipal election, the All India Trinamool Congress won in 12 wards out of the total 14 wards of Jaynagar Majilpur Municipality. Besides, Indian National Congress and Socialist Unity Centre of India (Communist) won in the other 2 wards.

Department

Service
The Jaynagar Majilpur Municipality is responsible for administering and providing basic infrastructure to the city.
 Water purification and supply
 Sewage treatment and disposal
 Garbage disposal and street cleanliness
 Food Inspection: Through JMM Food Inspectors
 Solid waste management
 Building and maintenance of roads, streets and flyovers
 Street lighting
 Maintenance of parks and open spaces
 Cemeteries and Crematoriums
 Registering of births and deaths
 Conservation of heritage sites
 Disease control, including immunisation
 Public municipal schools etc.

References

External links
 

Municipalities of West Bengal
1869 establishments in British India
Government of Jaynagar Majilpur